Guyjeh or Gowyjeh, also rendered as Gowjeh, may refer to:
 Guyjeh Qaleh (disambiguation)
 Guyjeh Qayah
 Gowyjeh Qomlaq (disambiguation)
 Guyjeh-ye Soltan
 Guyjeh, Kermanshah